Vincent Kigosi (Ray) (born 16 May 1980) is a Tanzanian  actor, producer and director.
Kigosi is based in Dar-es-Salaam.

Kigosi, most known as Ray, started his career 2000 in television soap opera / series and then started to appear in different movies up to now. He has his own company of film production together with his fellow actor Blandina chagula (Johari) the company called Rj Company.

Filmography
Sikitiko Langu (With Steven Kanumba, Nuru Nasoro, Blandina Chagula)
 Dangerous Desire  (With Steven Kanumba, Nuru Nasoro and Blandina Chagula)
Johari (Steven Kanumba, Blandina Chagula)
 Peace of mind ( with Irene Uwoya, Jacob Steven, Blandina Chagula)
 wicked love ( with Aunty Ezekiel and Blandina Chagula)
 waves of sorrow ( with Rose Ndauka, Yobnesh Yusuph and Slim Omary)
 Oprah ( with Steven Kanumba, Irene Uwoya)
 Off side ( with Steven Kanumba, Jacob Steven and Irene Uwoya)
 Woman of principles ( with Elizabeth Michael and Nargis Mohamed)
family disaster ( with Elizabeth Michael and Diana Kimaro)
 my dreams ( with Irene  uwoya, Rose Ndauka, Mahsein Awadh, Shamsa Ford and Elizabeth Michael)
 sobbing sound ( with Irene Uwoya, Haji Adam)
unpredictable ( with Irene Paul)
handsome wa kijiji  ( with Irene Paul, Flora Mvungi)
danger zone ( with Aunty Ezekiel, Mahsein Awadh, Elizabeth Gupta, Blandina Chagula)
 I hate my birthday  ( with Aunty Ezekiel and Irene Paul)
 Fair decision 
 Surprise 
V.I.P
Chickens head 
 Too much 
 Twisted 
 Second wife 
 The glory of Ramadhani 
 Hard Price 
Shell 
 Shakira 
One blood 
The Image 
Behind the scene 
 Revenge 
Fake Pastors 
Hot Friday 
Full Moon
Divorce
From China With True Love
Fan's Death
Pretty Girls 
Yellow Banana
Bad Luck

Awards and nominations
Won

Tanzania People's Choice Awards

|-
|2014
|Himself
|Favourite Actor
|
|-
|2015
|Himself
|Favourite Movie Director
|
|}

Steps Entertainment Awards

|-
|rowspan=2|2013
|Woman Of Principles
|Best Director
|
|-
|Rj Company
|Best Film Company
|
|}

Zanzibar International Film Festival

|-
|2011 
|Himself
|Tanzania Most Influential Movie Icon
|
|}

Action and Cut Viewers Choice Awards

|-
|rowspan=2|2014 
|Himself
|Lifetime Achievement
|
|-
|Twisted
|Best Director
|
|}

Filamu Central Website Awards ( Best of 2010)

|-
|rowspan=3|2010 
|
|Best Director
|
|-
|Danger zone
|Best movie cover 
|
|-
|Rj Company 
|Best Film Company
|
|}

Proin Promotions Awards

|-
|2015 
|Himself
|Best Director
|
|}

References

External links
 Kigosi's blog

Tanzanian male film actors
Living people
1980 births